"Everyone She Knows" is a song written by Ross Copperman, Shane McAnally, and Josh Osborne, and recorded by American country music singer Kenny Chesney. It is the fifth single from his 2020 album Here and Now.

Content
The song is about a woman who judges her own life by comparing herself to her peers before ultimately taking satisfaction in her own life. Chesney described the song as for "women who are their own compass", according to Taste of Country. Shaun Silva directed the song's music video, released in March 2022. The music video features actress Aylya Marzolf as the main character exploring the countryside.

Charts

References

2022 singles
2022 songs
Kenny Chesney songs
Songs written by Ross Copperman
Songs written by Shane McAnally
Songs written by Josh Osborne
Song recordings produced by Ross Copperman
Warner Records Nashville singles
Music videos directed by Shaun Silva